The qualification for the 2013 Women's European Volleyball Championship was held from May 11, 2012 to May 27, 2013.

First round
Dates: May 12–20, 2012
All times are local.
In case of a 1–1 tie, teams played a Golden Set to determine the winner.

|}

First leg

|}

Second leg

|}

Second round
The six group winners qualified directly for the 2013 Women's European Volleyball Championship, while the six runners-up moved on to the Third Round where three more teams qualified.

All times are local.

Pool A

|}

Tournament 1
The tournament was held at Aréna Poprad in Poprad, Slovakia.

|}

Tournament 2
The tournament was held at Metrowest Sport Palace in Ra'anana, Israel.

|}

Pool B

|}

Tournament 1
The tournament was held at Omnisport Apeldoorn in Apeldoorn, Netherlands.

|}

Tournament 2
The tournament was held at FSK Olymp in Yuzhne, Ukraine.

|}

Pool C

|}

Tournament 1
The tournament was held at Salohalli in Salo, Finland.

|}

Tournament 2
The tournament was held at Sports Games Palace in Baku, Azerbaijan.

|}

Pool D

|}

Tournament 1
The tournament was held at Sala Polivalentă in Piatra Neamţ, Romania.

|}

Tournament 2
The tournament was held at Valbruna in Rovinj, Croatia.

|}

Pool E

|}

Tournament 1
The tournament was held at Ljudski vrt Sports Hall in Maribor, Slovenia.

|}

Tournament 2
The tournament will be held at Sportcampus Lange Munte in Kortrijk, Belgium.

|}

Pool F

|}

Tournament 1
The tournament was held at Palace of Culture and Sports in Varna, Bulgaria.

|}

Tournament 2
The tournament was held at Bvuss in Budaörs, Hungary.

|}

Third round
Dates: May 31 – June 9, 2013
All times are local.
In case of a 1–1 tie, teams played a Golden Set to determine the winner.

|}
1 France won the golden set 15–11.
2 Belarus won the golden set 16–14.

First leg

|}

Second leg

|}

External links
Official website

Women's European Volleyball Championships
European Volleyball Championships
European Volleyball Championships
Qualification for volleyball competitions